Veldkamp is a surname. Notable people with the surname include:

Bart Veldkamp (born 1967), Dutch speed skater
Gerard Veldkamp (1921–1990), Dutch politician
Jan Frederik Veldkamp (1941-2017), Dutch botanist
Laura Veldkamp (born 1975), American economist
Tjibbe Veldkamp (born 1962), Dutch children's writer

See also
Veldkamp's dwarf epauletted fruit bat

Dutch-language surnames
Toponymic surnames